Centerville is an unincorporated community and census-designated place located at the junction of Louisiana Highways 182 and 317 in St. Mary Parish, Louisiana, United States.

It was first listed as a CDP in the 2020 census with a population of 499.

History

Columbian Chemical Plant Explosion Hoax
The Columbian Chemicals Plant explosion hoax involved a plant located near Centerville.

Demographics

2020 census

Note: the US Census treats Hispanic/Latino as an ethnic category. This table excludes Latinos from the racial categories and assigns them to a separate category. Hispanics/Latinos can be of any race.

Education
There is one school, Centerville School (K-12) of the St. Mary Parish School Board.

Notable people
Carl W. Bauer, Louisiana politician
Thomas G. Clausen, last elected Louisiana state education superintendent from 1984 to 1988, graduated from Centerville High School, c. 1957.
William J. Seymour, a prominent African-American religious leader in the early twentieth century.

Notes

Unincorporated communities in St. Mary Parish, Louisiana
Unincorporated communities in Louisiana